Eilema hybrida is a moth of the subfamily Arctiinae. It was described by Hervé de Toulgoët in 1957. It is found on Madagascar.

This species has a wingspan of 37 mm for the males and 50 mm for the females.

Subspecies
Eilema hybrida hybrida
Eilema hybrida griveaudiana Toulgoët, 1985
Eilema hybrida oberthueri Toulgoët, 1957
Eilema hybrida sogai Toulgoët, 1985
Eilema hybrida vadoniana Toulgoët, 1985

References

hybrida
Moths described in 1957